Chimalpopoca ( for "smoking shield," ) or Chīmalpopōcatzin (1397–1427) was the third Emperor of Tenochtitlan (1417–1427).

Biography 
Chimalpopoca was born to the Emperor Huitzilihuitl and Queen Ayauhcihuatl.

Rule
On the day of Chimalpopoca's coronation in 1417 (some sources say 1416 or 1418), his brother Tlacaelel I was named high priest. From this point on the ecclesiastical and governmental offices among the Aztecs were separate.

When he assumed the throne at age 20, Tenochtitlan was a tributary of the Tepanec city of Azcapotzalco, which was ruled by his grandfather Tezozomoc. This alliance, and the Mexicas' position within it, was strengthened by Tenochtitlan's loyalty during Tezozomoc's 1418 war with Ixtlilxochitl I of Texcoco. The conquered city was granted to Tenochtitlan as a tributary.

Nezahualcoyotl, displaced prince of Texcoco, was living in the mountains. Chimalpopoca interceded with Tezozomoc on his behalf, and Tezozomoc agreed to allow Netzahualcoyotl to live in Tenochtitlan under his protection.

In 1426 Tezozómoc assisted Chimalpopoca in the construction of a new aqueduct. This aqueduct was of wood, and ran from the elevated place of Chapultepec to Tenochtitlan.

Chimalpopoca also had a causeway constructed to Tlacopan. The causeway contained openings spanned by wooden bridges, which were removed at night. Also during his reign he dedicated a stone for sacrifices in the Tlacocomoco section of Tenochtitlan. To him is attributed the conquest of Tequizquiac.

Family

Chimalpopoca was the son of Huitzilihuitl, the previous ruler, but there are some sources that say he was a son of Acamapichtli, the first ruler of Tenochtitlan, making him Huitzilihuitl's brother. Gerónimo de Mendieta, in his Historia eclesiástica indiana, notes the discrepancy and concludes that Huitzilihuitl, Chimalpopoca and Itzcoatl (Chimalpopoca's successor) must have been brothers, based on his understanding on the Aztec system of succession.

He had many wives and children. One of the wives was his cousin Matlalatzin. His son was Tezozomoc, king of Ecatepec.

Three versions of the family tree of the first Aztec rulers:

Chimalpopoca was a grandson of Acamapichtli and Tezozomoc and half-brother of Moctezuma I.

Death
When Tezozomoc died in 1427 after a long reign, he was succeeded by his son Tayatzin. However Maxtla, ruler of Coyoacan and older half-brother of Tayatzin, soon incited a rebellion among the nobles of Azcapotzalco and usurped the throne. Chimalpopoca allied with Tayatzin, and the two conspired to retake the throne and kill Maxtla. Friendly relations between Tenochtitlan and Azcapotzalco were thus replaced by insults and violent intrigue, apparently involving tit-for-tat assassination attempts. Maxtla sent Chimalpopoca a present of women's clothing.

Teyatzin was killed, and Chimalpopoca decided to offer himself as a sacrifice at the altar of his father Huitzilíhuitl. Some of his nobles joined him. In the middle of the ceremony, before the tlatoani'''s turn, an expeditionary force from Azcapotzalco invaded Tenochtitlan, took Chimalpopoca prisoner and carried him to Azcapotzalco. There he was exhibited in a cage and kept on starvation rations. He committed suicide, hanging himself from a beam with his belt. (Another account says he was strangled by his captors.)

He was succeeded as tlatoani by his uncle Itzcoatl.

A rigorous and critical study based in the sources state, however, that Chimalpopoca's death must be interpreted as a coup d'etat.  Itzcoatl was the leader of a rebel faction against the Tepanec Empire. Chimalpopoca, as Tezozomoc's grandson, was the main collaborator of this Empire in Tenochtitlan, and consequently was the first victim of Itzcoatl. After the victory of the rebel coalition, the history was rewritten and the defeated Tepanecs was blamed for Chimalpopoca's death. This can be considered the official Mexica history (see Santamarina 2006: cap. XIII).

See also

List of Tenochtitlan rulers

Notes

References
"Azcapotzalco", Enciclopedia de México, vol. 2. Mexico City: 1987. 
"Chimalpopoca", Enciclopedia de México, vol. 4. Mexico City: 1987. 
García Puron, Manuel, México y sus gobernantes, vol. 1. Mexico City: Joaquín Porrua, 1984. 

Orozco Linares, Fernando, Gobernantes de México''. Mexico City: Panorama Editorial, 1985, . 
  See cap. XIII: 373-402.

External links

 Chimalpopoca entry on The Visual History Project

Tenochca tlatoque
15th-century monarchs in North America
15th-century indigenous people of the Americas
1397 births
1427 deaths
15th-century murdered monarchs
15th century in the Aztec civilization
Suicides in North America